Leah Danielle Dixon (born 26 August 1991) is a British professional racing cyclist from Wales, who currently rides for UCI Women's Continental Team .

Major results
2021
 3rd Time trial, National Road Championships

References

External links

1991 births
Living people
Welsh female cyclists